The Jongmyo ritual is an ancestor worship ceremony held at Jongmyos by the monarchs of the East Asian cultural sphere. Different dynasties have different rituals. The Korean Jongmyo jerye and Jongmyo ritual music were inscribed on the UNESCO Intangible Cultural Heritage Lists in 2001 by UNESCO.

References 

Jongmyo rites
Religious Confucianism